The Grand Duchy of Mecklenburg Friedrich-Franz Railway (Großherzoglich Mecklenburgische Friedrich-Franz-Eisenbahn) grouped two, narrow gauge, steam locomotives taken over from the Doberan-Heiligendamm railway (Doberan-Heiligendammer Eisenbahn or DHE) into the Mecklenburg XVIII engine class.

History

The long section through the town in Doberan in particular made the procurement of such engines sensible. When the private railways were nationalised in 1890 the locomotives were renumbered to 1001 and 1002. Not long afterwards, it became clear that the locomotives were not able to cope with the rising levels of traffic as they could only haul a three-coach train. So in 1891 and 1898 Class XIX engines were procured. The tramway locos were retired in 1916.

Design Details 
The locomotives were designed as box frame engines (Kastenlokomotiven) and had an outside plate frame with a well tank. The two saturated steam engines were on the inside, and the diagonally-oriented cylinders drove the rear coupled axle. The entire running gear was covered. Suspension was provided by leaf springs over the axle boxes. The boiler was horizontal. The firehole was located on the right hand side. In order to keep the minimise the impact when driving through Doberan, exhaust steam was expelled through a condenser. The footplate was located on the right hand side and could be used for driving both forwards and backwards due to the good visibility it afforded. Reversing the Joy valve gear was achieved using a lever working a crossed eccentric rod.

See also
Grand Duchy of Mecklenburg Friedrich-Franz Railway
List of Mecklenburg locomotives
Länderbahnen

Literature
 

0-4-0T locomotives
18
900 mm gauge locomotives
Hohenzollern locomotives
Railway locomotives introduced in 1886
B n2t locomotives